Deathmoon is a 1978 American made-for-television horror film from EMI Television directed by Bruce Kessler. Jason Palmer is sent on vacation by his doctor. He goes to Hawaii, because that's where his grandfather once worked. Palmer doesn't know that his grandpa and all male successors are cursed by a coven. Every evening he morphs into a werewolf and ravages young ladies.

Cast

Robert Foxworth as Jason Palmer
Joe Penny as Rick Bladen
Barbara Trentham as Diane May
Dolph Sweet as Lieutenant Russ Cort
Charles Haid as Earl Wheelie
Debralee Scott as Sherry Weston
France Nuyen as Tapulua
Carole Kai as Tami Waimea
Branscombe Richmond as Vince Tatupu
Joan Freeman as Mrs. Jennings

References

External links
Death Moon at TCMDB
Deathmoon at IMDb

1978 television films
1978 films
1978 horror films
CBS network films
Films set in Hawaii
Films shot in Hawaii
American horror television films
American werewolf films
EMI Films films
Films scored by Paul Chihara
Films directed by Bruce Kessler
1970s American films